Twelve ships of the Royal Navy have borne the name HMS Thetis, named after the sea-nymph in Greek mythology:

  was a 22-gun storeship launched in 1717. Her fate is unknown.
  was a 44-gun fifth rate launched in 1747. She became a hospital ship in 1757 and was sold in 1767.
  was a 32-gun fifth rate launched in 1773 and wrecked entering the Careenage at St. Lucia Bay in 1781.
  was a 38-gun fifth rate launched in 1782 and sold in 1814.
  was an 8-gun schooner purchased in 1796 and listed until 1800.
 HMS Thetis was a 24-gun sixth rate that the Royal Navy captured from the Dutch at Demerara in 1796 and later scuttled there. She was a Dutch 7th Charter frigate built at Amsterdam and launched in 1785. Her dimensions, in Dutch feet of 11 Rotterdam inches, were: 125' 7/11" x 34' x 13' 2/11".
  was a 10-gun gun-brig launched in 1810 and on the lists until at least 1836.
  was a 46-gun fifth rate launched in 1817 and wrecked off Arraial do Cabo (near Cape Frio) in 1830.
  was a 36-gun fifth rate launched in 1846 and transferred to Prussia in 1855 in exchange for two gunboats.
  was a  wooden screw corvette launched in 1871 and sold in 1887.
  was an  second-class protected cruiser launched in 1890. She was used as a minelayer from 1907 and was sunk in 1918 as a blockship at Zeebrugge.
  was a T-class submarine launched in 1938. She sank during trials but was salvaged and recommissioned as HMS Thunderbolt. The Italian corvette Cicogna sank Thunderbolt in 1943.

See also
 Thetis Island
 Thetis Lake

Citations and references
Citations

References
 
 
 van Maanen, Ron, Preliminary list of Dutch naval vessel built or required in the period 1700-1799. Unpublished manuscript.

Royal Navy ship names